The Ladora Savings Bank is a historic structure along U.S. Route 6 in Ladora, Iowa, United States.  Constructed in 1920, it was closed when the bank that built it failed in the Great Depression, leaving it to be used by a succession of businesses.  It was occupied by a restaurant, the Ladora Bank Bistro, but that closed down in February 2019. It has been listed on the National Register of Historic Places since August 3, 1990.

Structure
Designed by William Lightner and Charles B. Zalesky, the masonry Neoclassically styled building included two substantial Doric columns in its facade and several tall windows on the sides. The structure originally included restrooms (including an outside exit for women to use discreetly), which were an unusual feature; at its opening, the bank promoted these restrooms to its customers. Among its interior features visible to the public were marble counters, wooden floors, and paintings on the wall, while massive vaults were built to protect valuables; recent renovations have restored these features, most of which still remain.

History
The Ladora Savings Bank building was dedicated on July 26, 1920. The bank survived the tumultuous economic times of the 1920s, but it could not withstand the Great Depression, which led to its closure on July 27, 1931. The building remained a center of life in Ladora: during various times in its history, it served as a community center, housing a Red Cross office during World War II and a civil defense shelter during the Cold War; it was also a polling place for many years.  It was also a commercial building at certain points in its history, housing at various times an insurance salesman's office, an attorney's office, an antique shop, and a rest area for truck drivers traveling along U.S. 6. During this period, it was added to the National Register of Historic Places, being included primarily for its architecture.

Reopening
After some years of inactivity, the bank building was purchased in October 2004 by businessman Dimitri Makedonsky, who also owns properties around the bank.  Dimitri proceeded to renovate the building: replacing the roof, redesigning the interior, and gradually restoring the interior to an appearance similar to that of a bank from the 1920s.  Hoping to open a restaurant in the building, he refurbished several major side rooms: as the celebrated original restrooms no longer functioned, they were turned into museum rooms, while the bank's substantial vault became a lounge.  The restaurant opened on May 15, 2008. After over a decade of operating as The Ladora Bank Bistro, the building now houses an Iowa Caucus themed bistro named Caucus Bistro.

References

External links

Ladora Bank Bistro

National Register of Historic Places in Iowa County, Iowa
Commercial buildings completed in 1920
1931 disestablishments in Iowa
Restaurants established in 2008
Neoclassical architecture in Iowa
Defunct banks of the United States
Buildings and structures in Iowa County, Iowa
Bank buildings on the National Register of Historic Places in Iowa
Restaurants in Iowa